= Shigatse Shandong Mansion =

Building in Shigatse, Tibet, China

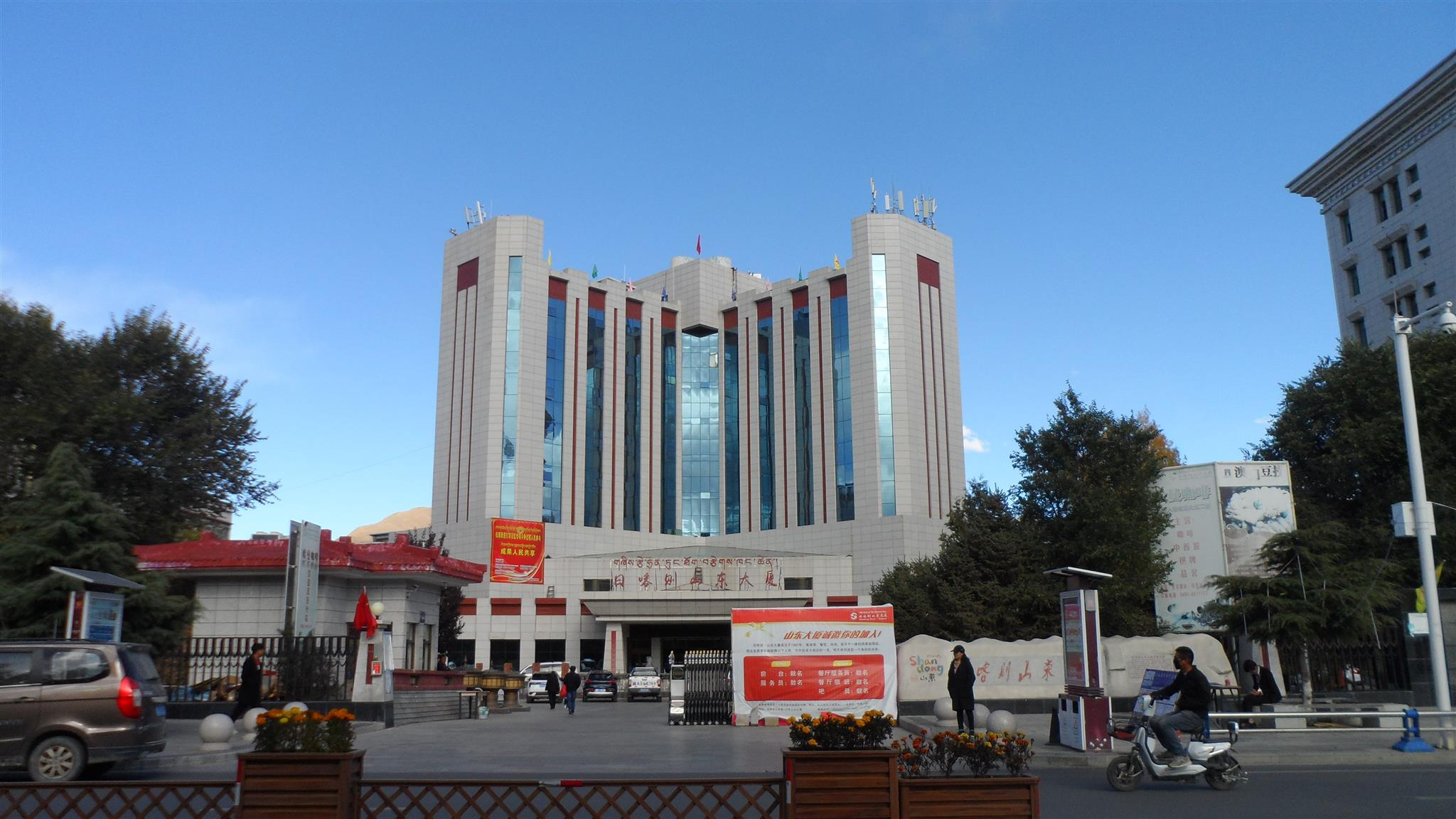
Shigatse Shandong Mansion

Shigatse Shandong Mansion is a hotel located on Beijing North Road in Shigatse, Tibet.

== History ==
The foundation stone laying ceremony was held in mid-April 1997 in Shigatse. The building, completed in October 1998, covers an area of 10,800 square meters, with 8 floors in three dimensions, 10 floors in part, and a total height of 39.2 meters. Shigatse Shandong Mansion has 111 guest rooms of various kinds with 220 beds, equipped with central air-conditioning, satellite TV, domestic and international direct-dial telephone. In April 2012, Shandong Aid for Tibet upgraded and remodeled Shandong Mansion.
